Little Carp River is a  river in Gogebic and  Ontonagon counties in the U.S. state of Michigan.

The river arches broadly southwest to northwest and empties into Lake Superior at  approximately one mile from the mouth of the Carp River.

Tributaries and features (from the mouth):
 Traders Falls
 (left) Memengwa Creek
 Explorers Falls
 Trappers Falls
 (right) Wabeno Creek
 Greenstone Falls
 Overlooked Falls
 (right) Blowdown Creek
 (right) Beaver Creek
 Lily Pond
 Mirror Lake
 Trail Creek

References 

Rivers of Michigan
Rivers of Gogebic County, Michigan
Rivers of Ontonagon County, Michigan
Tributaries of Lake Superior